The 2023 KNSB Dutch Single Distance Championships took place in Heerenveen at the Thialf ice skating rink from Friday 3 February 2023 to Sunday 5 February 2023. The best skaters qualified for the 2023 ISU World Speed Skating Championships in Heerenveen.

Schedule

Medalists

Men

Women

Source:

References

External links
 KNSB

Dutch Single Distance Championships
Single Distance Championships
2023 Single Distance
KNSB Dutch Single Distance Championships, 2023
KNSB